Nicolás Massú was the defending champion, but lost in the semifinals this year.

Martin Verkerk won the tournament, beating Fernando González in the final, 7–6(7–5), 4–6, 6–4.

Seeds

Draw

Finals

Top half

Bottom half

References

 Main Draw
 Qualifying Draw

Dutch Open (tennis)
2004 ATP Tour
2004 Dutch Open (tennis)